Shoreline Christian School may refer to:

Shoreline Christian School (Austin, Texas)
Shoreline Christian School (Fountain Valley, California)
Shoreline Christian School (Shoreline, Washington)